Fort Babine, British Columbia (Wit'at) is a small native reserve community, located at the northern tip of Babine Lake, approximately 100 km north of Smithers.  It is accessible by an all-weather gravel logging road.  There are approximately 60 year-round residents.  The community comprises five Indian reserves in the area, Babine Indian Reserve No. 16, Babine Indian Reserve No. 6, Casdeded Indian Reserve No. 8, No-Cut Indian Reserve No. 5, and Alphonse Tommy Indian Reserve No. 7.

Rainbow Alley Provincial Park is located just north of Fort Babine, between the north end of Babine Lake and the south end of Nilkitkwa Lake.

Traditional name
Fort Babine's traditional Babine name is "Wit'at," which is an abbreviated form of "Wit'ane Keh," "place of making dry fish."  The name "Babine" comes from a French word for "pendulous lips" and refers to the fact that the native female inhabitants first encountered by Europeans had the practice of placing wooden labrets in their lips to enlarge them.

History 
Archaeological evidence indicates that there is a long history of human habitation in the Fort Babine area.  When the first Europeans arrived, there was at least a summer village in this location—and there may possibly have been full-time occupants.  The first Hudson's Bay Company post was established further down the lake in 1822.  Fort Kilmaurs, also known as Fort Babine and later Old Fort, was eventually closed and the H.B.C. moved to the northern tip of the lake to establish a new Fort Babine.  This happened in the 1840s.  The H.B.C. store closed in the 1970s, but the native community remained.  A direct road link to the community was finally established in the 1980s, as well as the supply of electricity.  Regular telephone service finally came to Fort Babine in the spring of 2006.

Socio-economic conditions 

The people of Fort Babine are employed in several resource-based sectors.  Silviculture and forestry offer seasonal employment, as does the nearby Babine Salmon Project.  Year-round employment is available at the Fort Babine Fish Hatchery.  Several community members are also employed by the Lake Babine Nation in various capacities.  Nevertheless, unemployment or underemployment, as in many reserve communities, remains a concern.

References

Hudson's Bay Company forts
Babine
Omineca Country